Hidden Armenians or crypto-Armenians is an umbrella term to describe Turkish citizens hiding their full or partial Armenian ancestry from the larger Turkish society. They are mostly descendants of Ottoman Armenians who, at least outwardly, were Islamized (and Turkified or Kurdified) "under the threat of physical extermination" during the Armenian genocide.

Turkish journalist Erhan Başyurt describes hidden Armenians as "families (and in some cases, entire villages or neighbourhoods) [...] who converted to Islam to escape the deportations and death marches [of 1915], but continued their hidden lives as Armenians, marrying among themselves and, in some cases, clandestinely reverting to Christianity." According to the 2012 European Commission report on Turkey, a "number of crypto-Armenians have started to use their original names and religion." The Economist suggests that the number of Turks who reveal their Armenian background is growing. In Turkish, they are sometimes referred to by the derogatory term "leftovers of the sword".

History

Background
Armenians are originally from the Armenian Highlands. The western parts of what is called the Six Vilayets came under the Ottoman Empires control in the 16th century with the Peace of Amasya. Armenians remained an overwhelming majority of the area's population until the 17th century; however, their number gradually decreased, and by the early 20th century they constituted up to 38% of the population of Western Armenia, designed at the time as the Six Vilayets. Kurds made up a significant part of the population.

Armenian genocide

In 1915 and the following years, the Armenians living in their ancestral lands in the Ottoman Empire were systematically exterminated by the Young Turk government in the Armenian genocide. The Ittihadists who perpetrated the genocide did not have the same understanding of race and nationality as the Nazis that the nationality could be changed by religious conversion to Islam and likewise, Protestant and Catholic Armenians could be exempted from deportation. 

Daniel Jonah Goldhagen explains that perpetrators differ in how they treat the targeted group's children: "In some instances, owing to the perpetrators' social theory, they treat children of groups targeted because of ethnicity or nationality radically differently from their parents. The Turks conceiving of their existential enemies the Armenians not entirely coherently, an unstable agglomeration of a national/ethnic/religious-based hatred, nevertheless had a decidedly nonracist view of them." He further explains that the Turks adopted a formal policy of "leaving the girls and children to be islamized". Although many children were killed, some were spared and allowed to live as Turks. Genocide historian Norman Naimark writes: 
"Thousands of Armenian children were raised as Muslims and Turks, while women and girls were routinely converted, taken into harems, and married to Turkish, Kurdish and Circassian husbands. In the period 1918-1922, some of these women and children, encouraged by the Western powers and anti-Ittihadist Ottoman officials, reconnected with their Armenian families and communities. But women seventeen or over or those married to Muslims could choose to stay with their new families, and many did. Under the French occupation, many Armenian children were turned over by Turkish families to the Armenian community, but, wrote one Armenian officer, 'many of them want to go back.'"

When relief workers and surviving Armenians started to search for and claim back these Armenian orphans after World War I, only a small percentage were found and reunited, while many others continued to live as Muslims. Additionally, there were cases of entire families converting to Islam to survive the genocide.

Republican period
"After converting to Islam, many of the crypto-Armenians said they still faced unfair treatment: their land was often confiscated, the men were humiliated with "circumcision checks" in the army and some were tortured." Between the 1930s and 1980s, the Turkish government conducted a secret investigation of hidden Armenians.

The term "Crypto-Armenians" appears as early as 1956.

Recent developments
According to Turkish sources, hidden Armenians in Turkey no longer feel they have to keep their Armenian identity secret. Some have been baptized into the Church and started using Armenian names.
 
In 2010, a mass was held at the Cathedral of the Holy Cross in Aghtamar (called Akdamar Kilisesi in Turkish) for the first time in 95 years. After a million-dollar restoration, the church was reopened as a museum in 2007. 2010 marked the first Christian prayer service at Aghtamar since the genocide. In September 2010, 2,000 Armenians attended a mass at the Cathedral.

When the Surp Giragos Church was reopened in 2011, dozens of Armenians who had been raised Muslim participated in a baptism ceremony at the restored church. The names of those who participated in the baptism ceremony, conducted by Deputy Patriarch Archbishop Aram Ateşyan, were not released publicly for security reasons. Turkish-Armenians who wish to convert must first file for a formal "change of religion" at court. They then go to the Church where they learn about the foundational teachings of the Christian faith. When it is decided that the applicant has understood these teachings, they are permitted to prepare for the baptism ceremony.

In 2012, Agos reported that the head of the Dersim Armenians Faith and Ancestry Assistance Organization (Dersimli Ermeniler İnanç ve Soyal Yardımlaşma Derneği) has said that hidden Armenians have nothing to fear in the present day.

In May 2015, 12 Armenians from Tunceli were baptized. The twelve Armenians were baptized together in a collective ceremony after a six-month education about Christian beliefs.

, there are twenty Armenian schools in Istanbul. Armenian and Muslim families live in mixed neighborhoods. In the past Armenian was only spoken at home, but some Armenians living in Istanbul report that they now speak Armenian openly in the streets.

Literature
One of the first books to draw international attention to hidden Armenians was My Grandmother: An Armenian-Turkish Memoir written by  Armenian-Turkish writer Fethiye Çetin. Along with Çetin, Ayse Gul Altinay, Gerard Libaridian, and Maureen Freely co-edited an anthology of testimonies of Islamized Armenians called The Grandchildren.

Avedis Hadjian's Secret Nation: The Hidden Armenians of Turkey is an exhaustive survey of the islamicized or hidden Armenians who live in the former Armenian provinces of Turkey as well as other parts of the country.

Regions
Most Crypto-Armenians reside in the eastern provinces of Turkey, where the pre-genocide Armenian population was concentrated.

Tunceli (Dersim) Armenians

Through the 20th century, an unknown number of Armenians living in the mountainous region of Tunceli (Dersim) had converted to Alevism. During the Armenian genocide, many of the Armenians in the region were saved by their Kurdish neighbors. According to Mihran Prgiç Gültekin, the head of the Union of Dersim Armenians, around 75% of the population of Dersim are "converted Armenians." He reported in 2012 that over 200 families in Tunceli have declared their Armenian descent, but others are afraid to do so. In April 2013, Aram Ateşyan, the acting Armenian Patriarch of Constantinople, stated that 90% of Tunceli's population is of Armenian origin.

Diyarbakır
Before the genocide Diyarbakır was a town with notable Armenian population. There are still some surviving church towers in the now predominantly ethnic Kurdish city, but most of the churches are in a dilapidated condition. In the past, Christian Armenians had to remain hidden but the situation has improved. The Armenian community has restored one of the churches and Armenian language lessons are available.

Notable hidden Armenians
Fethiye Çetin (b. 1950 in Maden, Elâzığ Province), lawyer, writer and human rights activist
Ahmet Abakay (b. 1950 in Divriği), journalist
Yaşar Kurt (b. 1968), rock singer
Ruhi Su (1912-1985), musician

Number
Various scholars and authors have estimated the number of individuals of full or partial Armenian descent living in Turkey. The range of the estimates is great due to different criteria used. Most of these numbers do not make a distinction between hidden Armenians and Islamized Armenians. According to journalist Erhan Başyurt the main difference between the two groups is their self-identity. Islamized Armenian, in his words, are "children of women who were saved by Muslim families and have continued their lives among them", while hidden Armenians "continued their hidden lives as Armenians."

See also
Passing (race)
Armenians in Turkey
Anti-Armenian sentiment in Turkey
Hamshenis
Crypto-Christianity
Crypto-Jews
Crypto-Paganism
Dönmeh
Armenia without Armenians
Western Armenia
Western Armenian
White genocide
Vorpahavak

References
Notes

Citations

Bibliography
Hadjian, Avedis (2018). Secret Nation: The Hidden Armenians of Turkey. I.B.Tauris. 

Armenian people by religion
Ethnic Armenian people
Passing (sociology)
Crypto-Christianity
Western Armenia